South Malda College is a college in Pubarun in the Malda district of West Bengal, India. The college is affiliated to the University of Gour Banga,  offering undergraduate courses.

Departments

Arts and Commerce
Bengali 
English
Arabic
History
Political Science
Sociology
Education
Economics
Commerce

See also

References

External links 
South Malda College 
University of Gour Banga
University Grants Commission
National Assessment and Accreditation Council

Universities and colleges in Malda district
Colleges affiliated to University of Gour Banga
Academic institutions formerly affiliated with the University of North Bengal
Educational institutions established in 1971
1971 establishments in West Bengal